Ommochrome (or visual pigment) refers to several biological pigments that occur in the eyes of crustaceans and insects. The eye color is determined by the ommochromes. Ommochromes are also found in the chromatophores of cephalopods, and in spiders.

Ommochromes are metabolites of tryptophan, via kynurenine and 3-hydroxykynurenine. They are responsible for a wide variety of colors, ranging from yellow over red and brown to black. Lighter colors tend to be generated by ommatins, while mixtures of ommatin and ommins are responsible for darker colors.

In spiders, ommochromes are usually deposited as pigment granules within the cells of the hypodermis, immediately beneath the cuticle.

A study on various insects showed that ommochromes in their eyes have high antioxidant activity. The ommochromes were found to have the ability to suppress the Maillard reaction.

See also 
 Opsin

References 

Biological pigments
Organic pigments